This article refers to the military man. For the pen name of Mary Anne Evans, see George Eliot.

George Frank Elliott (November 30, 1846 – November 4, 1931) was a United States Marine Corps major general. He was the tenth Commandant of the Marine Corps between 1903 and 1910.

Biography
George Elliott, born in Eutaw, Alabama, was appointed to the United States Military Academy in 1868 and was honorably discharged in June 1870 upon the completion of two-years of the four-year course of study there.

In October 1870, he was appointed a second lieutenant in the Marine Corps by the President of the United States. Second Lieutenant Elliott served at the Marine Barracks, Washington, D.C., from the time of his appointment to the Marine Corps until 1871, when he was transferred to Portsmouth, New Hampshire. He was in command of the detachment that guarded the Baltimore and Ohio Railroad tunnel and also acted as guard for the paymaster of the railroad. He returned to Norfolk upon detachment from that duty. He was promoted to first lieutenant in 1878.

In 1880, First Lieutenant Elliott was ordered to duty on board  and served at the Marine Barracks, Boston, Massachusetts, from 1882 to 1884, when he returned to Norfolk. He was with the Marine battalion sent to the Isthmus of Panama in 1885. He was promoted to captain in 1892.

In June 1895, Captain Elliott was sent to the Marine Barracks, Brooklyn, New York, and from 22 April to 22 September 1898, he was on duty with the 1st Marine Battalion with the North Atlantic Fleet. The fleet was sent to hold its position at Guantanamo Bay, Cuba.

In this they failed, and the main force was discovered by the Spanish outpost, which retreated immediately and gave the alarm to the main body, whose headquarters were in a house at Cuzco. A high mountain separated the two forces at this point and each attempted to gain its crest as a point of vantage. The Marines were successful, but were fired on heavily by the enemy from the valley. Following a straggling retreat by the Spaniards, the Marines began the return march, the well having been destroyed. For his eminent and conspicuous conduct in this engagement, Captain Elliott's seniority in his grade was advanced three numbers.

Later in 1898, upon his return to the United States, he became a Veteran Companion of the Pennsylvania Commandery of the Military Order of Foreign Wars.

In October 1898, he was detached from the Marine Barracks in Brooklyn and ordered to the Marine Barracks at the Washington Navy Yard.  He was promoted to Major (United States) in March 1899.

In August 1899, Major Elliott was ordered to command the Second Battalion of Marines for duty in the Philippines and was promoted to lieutenant colonel in September of that year. From October 1899 to January 1900, Lt. Col Elliott commanded the First Brigade of Marines in the Philippines. During this period he engaged in the Battle of Novaleta. For his conduct during this battle, he was personally commended by Secretary of the Navy Long. Secretary Long wrote:

On his return to the United States he was on duty at Norfolk until 1903, when he was given command of the Marine Barracks, Washington, D.C., and promoted to colonel in March 1903.

On 3 October 1903, he was appointed Brigadier General Commandant of the Marine Corps, relieving Major General Charles Heywood. In December 1903, he was ordered to command a Provisional Brigade of Marines organized for service in Panama. He departed on 27, December with the brigade on board , arriving at Colón on 3 January 1904, and went into camp at Haute Obispo, Panama. He relinquished command of the brigade on 15 February 1904, and resumed his duties at Headquarters Marine Corps on the 25th of the same month.

On 21 May 1908, he was appointed Major General Commandant of the Marine Corps. One of the most difficult endeavors of General Elliott's career was his successful resistance to attempts to remove seagoing Marines from capital ships and to merge the Corps into the Army. Also during his tenure, the home post of the Corps, the Marine Barracks at 8th and I Streets SE in Washington, D.C., underwent major changes. In 1903, the old barracks were condemned and pulled down and by 1910 had been rebuilt essentially in their present form. He was placed on the retired list on 30 November 1910 upon reaching the statutory retirement age.

Major General Elliott died at his home in Washington, D.C., shortly after noon 4 November 1931 after a brief illness. His remains were interred in the Arlington National Cemetery.

Legacy
USS George F. Elliott (AP-13), a Heywood-class transport (1918–1942), was named in honor of Major General Elliott.  The ship was sunk off Guadalcanal in 1942.

USS George F. Elliott (AP-105) was also named after him.  The second Elliott was commissioned on 23 September 1943 and decommissioned on 10 June 1946.

General Elliott's nephew was Vice Admiral Elliott Buckmaster, USN (1889-1976).  VADM Buckmaster commanded the USS Yorktown when it was sunk at the Battle of Midway.

Awards
Sampson Medal
Spanish Campaign Medal
Philippine Campaign Medal

See also

References

1846 births
1931 deaths
People from Eutaw, Alabama
Burials at Arlington National Cemetery
American military personnel of the Philippine–American War
American military personnel of the Spanish–American War
United States Marine Corps generals
United States Marine Corps Commandants
United States Military Academy alumni
Military personnel from Alabama